Cercospora hydrangeae is a fungal plant pathogen.

References

hydrangeae
Fungal plant pathogens and diseases